"Another Saturday Night" is a 1963 hit single by Sam Cooke from the album Ain't That Good News. The song was written by Cooke while touring in England when staying in a hotel where no female guests were allowed.  It reached No. 10 on the Billboard Hot 100 and was No. 1 on the R&B chart for a single week.  In the UK, the song peaked at No. 23 on the UK Singles Chart.

Cooke's version featured his spoken recitation, which is done during the instrumental break.

Session drummer Hal Blaine played on Cooke's version of the song. Other musicians on the record included John Anderson on trumpet, John Ewing on trombone, Jewell Grant on sax, Ray Johnson on piano, and Clifton White and Rene Hall on guitar, and Clifford Hills on bass.

Cash Box described it as "a tale of a guy who’s got the money, but not the gal to spend it on," stating that "the teen set won’t take the deck seriously, but will find it a highly pleasurable listening/dance floor treat."

Cat Stevens version

In 1974, Cat Stevens recorded a version of the song that peaked at No. 6 on the U.S. Hot 100, No. 13 Easy Listening, No. 1 in Canada twice, on September 28 and October 19, separated by two other No. 1s, and No. 19 in Stevens' UK homeland.

Chart history

Weekly charts

Year-end charts

Other covers, remixes and samples
Claude François recorded the song in French as "La vie d'un homme" (lit. "A man's life").
Australian James Blundell covered the song on his 1989 self titled album.
In 1993, Jimmy Buffett recorded the song. His version peaked at No. 74 on the Billboard Hot Country Singles & Tracks chart.
Sam & Dave recorded at least one version that appears on albums released after their formative years such as the I Thank You compilation released in 2002 by the Brentwood Records label.
Puerto Rican rock en Español singer Charlie Robles covered the song in Spanish, naming it "Anoche no Dormí" ("I Didn't Sleep Last night"). (in Spanish)

References

1963 songs
1963 singles
Sam Cooke songs
Cat Stevens songs
Jimmy Buffett songs
RPM Top Singles number-one singles
Songs written by Sam Cooke
Song recordings produced by Hugo & Luigi
RCA Victor singles
1974 singles
Song recordings produced by Paul Samwell-Smith
Island Records singles
A&M Records singles